The National Alliance of Latin American and Caribbean Communities (NALACC) is a network of approximately 75 community-based organizations led by Latin American and Caribbean immigrants. NALACC member organizations work to improve the quality of life in their communities, both in the United States and in their countries of origin.  The NALACC also seeks to build transnational leadership capacity and increase immigrant civic participation, aiming to assist immigrants advocate effectively for public policies that address the root causes of migration, as well as addressing challenges faced by immigrants in the United States. To date, this latter work has focused on efforts to reform US immigration policies to make them more humane and effective.

External links
Official website of NALCC : www.nalcc.org

Caribbean-American organizations
Community organizing
Civil liberties advocacy groups in the United States
Hispanic and Latino American organizations
Organizations established in 2004
Immigrant rights organizations in the United States
Supraorganizations
Government watchdog groups in the United States
Legal advocacy organizations in the United States
Latin America and the Caribbean